The 1949 Los Angeles Rams season was the team's 12th year with the National Football League and the fourth in Los Angeles. The Rams were 8–2–2 and won the Western Division title, then lost to the Philadelphia Eagles in the NFL Championship Game. 

This is the only season where the Rams wore red jerseys at home and red helmets for both home and away games, the next season they would switch back to purple.

Regular season

Schedule

Standings

Playoffs

References

Los Angeles Rams
Los Angeles Rams seasons
Los Angeles